Hwanggeum-dong is a ward of Gimcheon, Gyeongsangbuk-do, South Korea.

References

Gimcheon
Neighbourhoods in South Korea